The Battle of Zepita, also known as the Battle of Chua Chua, was fought between the forces of future Peruvian president Santa Cruz and the Viceroyalty of Peru. Santa Cruz's army captured 240 rifles, 52 saddles, 240 lances and 63 sabers from the Royalist army.

References
 

Conflicts in 1823
August 1823 events
Zepita
1823 in South America
1823 in Peru
History of Puno Region